tvtwm is an X window manager derived from twm to which it adds the virtual desktop feature from swm. All of these window managers were originally written by Tom LaStrange. The current maintainer of tvtwm is Chris Ross. James Tanis believes he may be the only remaining user of tvtwm, and placed a notice on his web site seeking other users who would like a bug fix release.

Unlike most more recent virtual window managers, tvtwm models the root window as a single large space, with the physical desktop being a viewport onto that virtual root window.  The user can scroll the viewport around the virtual desktop either by pressing certain keys or by clicking into a scaled down representation of the virtual desktop, the so-called panner.

 tvtwm7 GNU automake build source of original tvtwm

History
 Announcement of patchlevel 1 31 August 1990
 Announcement of patchlevel 2 5 September 1990
 Announcement of patchlevel 3 3 October 1990
 Patch 4 (no announcement) 16 November 1990
 Announcement of patchlevel 5 24 April 1991
 Announcement of patchlevel 6 13 June 1991
 Patch 7 was included on the contrib tape for X11R5
 Patch 10 was included in the contrib section for X11R6
 The latest release is patchlevel 11

References

Free X window managers